Charaxes sidamo is a butterfly in the family Nymphalidae. It is found in southern and north-eastern Ethiopia. The habitat consists of thornbush savanna (thornbush = Vachellia). The holotype (male) is in the Muséum national d’Histoire naturelle.

References

Charaxes sidamo images at Bold

Butterflies described in 1979
sidamo
Endemic fauna of Ethiopia
Butterflies of Africa